4 of a Kind is the fourth album by the American crossover thrash band D.R.I., which was released in 1988. The album features the song "Suit And Tie Guy", which had a music video made for it. It was the first D.R.I. song to get a video.

Track listing

Credits 
 Spike Cassidy – guitar
 Kurt Brecht – vocals
 Felix Griffin – drums
 Josh Pappe – bass

References 

D.R.I. (band) albums
1988 albums